Oldman Lake is located in Glacier National Park, in the U. S. state of Montana. Oldman Lake is immediately east of Mount Morgan and north of Flinsch Peak. Oldman Lake is a  hike from the Two Medicine Store.

See also
List of lakes in Glacier County, Montana

References

Lakes of Glacier National Park (U.S.)
Lakes of Glacier County, Montana